I Just Started Hatin' Cheatin' Songs Today is the first album by country singer Moe Bandy (Marion Franklin Bandy, Jr.). It was released in 1974 on the GRC label.

Track listing
"I Just Started Hatin' Cheatin' Songs Today" (A. L. "Doodle" Owens, Sanger D. Shafer) - 2:57
"Cowboys and Playboys" (Sanger D. Shafer) - 2:28
"How Long Does It Take (To Be a Stranger)" (Dallas Frazier, Sanger D. Shafer) - 1:52
"Get All Your love Together (And Come On Home)" (Gene Vowell, A. L "Doodle" Owens, Glenn Sutton) - 2:49
"How Far Do You Think We Would Go" (Gene Vowell, A. L. "Doodle" Owens) - 2:47
"Smoke Filled Bar" (Ginger Boatwright) - 3:10
"This Time I Won't Cheat on Her Again" (A. L. "Doodle" Owens, Dallas Frazier) - 2:30
"Home Is Where The Hurt Is" (A. L. "Doodle" Owens) - 2:31
"I Wouldn't Cheat on Her If She Was Mine" (Paul Huffman, Joane Keller, Bucky Jones) - 2:31
"Honky Tonk Amnesia" (Sanger D. Shafer, A. L. "Doodle" Owens) - 2:33

Production
Sound Engineer - Lou Bradley
Album Graphics - Pinwheel Studios
Cover Photo - Bob Jones, Pinwheel Studios
Graphic Production - Bill Ward

References 

1974 debut albums
Moe Bandy albums
Albums produced by Ray Baker (music producer)